Franz Xaver Freiherr von Neveu (1749–1828) was the last Prince-Bishop of Basel, reigning from 1794 to 1803.  After the Prince-Bishopric of Basel was mediatised to the Margraviate of Baden in 1803, Neveu remained Bishop of Basel, though without exercising temporal power, until his death in 1828.

Biography

Franz Xaver von Neveu was born in Birseck Castle on 26 February 1749, the son of Franz Karl Ignaz Freiherr von Neveu and his wife Maria Sophia Reuttner von Weyl.

He served as a page in the court of Simon Nikolaus Euseb von Montjoye-Hirsingen, Prince Bishop of Basel, at Porrentruy, and then spent 1762-69 studying at the Jesuit gymnasium in Porrentruy.  In 1769, he began his studies at the University of Strasbourg.

At Strasbourg, he was ordained as a priest on 15 March 1777.  In 1789, he became a canon (Domizellar) of Basel Münster.  He became a member of the cathedral chapter on 28 January 1792.  The French Revolution spread into the Prince-Bishopric of Basel, with French troops entering the prince-bishopric in April 1792.  Neveu and the rest of the cathedral chapter fled to Arlesheim, then to Freiburg im Breisgau.

On 2 June 1794 the cathedral chapter elected Neveu to be the new Prince-Bishop of Basel, with Pope Pius VI confirming his appointment on 12 September 1794.  At the time of his election, the northern portion of the Prince-Bishopric of Basel had already been incorporated into the Rauracian Republic in December 1792.  As such, Neveu's temporal authority only extended to Bellelay Abbey, Moutier-Grandval Abbey, Erguel, Orvin, Biel, La Neuveville, and Schliengen.

The Treaty of Campo Formio (18 October 1797) awarded the French First Republic a free hand in Switzerland, and on 14 December 1797 French troops occupied the remainder of the Prince-Bishopric of Basel.  In 1803, this southern portion of the prince-bishopric was mediatised to the Margraviate of Baden, and Neveu lost the last of his temporal power over the prince-bishopric.  He remained Bishop of Basel until his death.

He died in Offenburg on 23 August 1828.

References

1749 births
1828 deaths
Prince-Bishops of Basel
People from Basel-Landschaft